Major League Soccer teams have participated in the CONCACAF Champions League each season since the tournament began its current format in 2008–09. Previously, MLS teams played in the CONCACAF Champions Cup.
MLS may send up to five teams to the CONCACAF Champions League each season — up to four from the United States, and up to one from Canada.

The first MLS team to finish first in its group was Real Salt Lake in 2010.
The first Champions League title won by an MLS side occurred in 2022, when Seattle Sounders FC defeated Mexico's UNAM 5–2 on aggregate in the final. Real Salt Lake, CF Montréal, Toronto FC and Los Angeles FC all also reached the final, with Real Salt Lake losing to Monterrey in 2011, CF Montréal to Club América in 2015, Toronto FC to Guadalajara in 2018 and Los Angeles FC to UANL in 2020, respectively. Seattle are thus far the only MLS team to have won the Champions League under its current format since 2008–09, and therefore will be the first MLS side to participate at the FIFA Club World Cup.

Performance by round
The following table shows the number of MLS participants in the Champions League each season, as well as the number of MLS teams that have reached various stages in the knockout rounds. MLS teams performed poorly during the first two years, as fixture congestion from the Superliga tournament as well as CONCACAF Champions League preliminary rounds meant that MLS teams often fielded teams without their first choice players.

Beginning in 2018, the Champions League format was changed to eliminate group play and the knockout round starts with sixteen teams rather than eight.

Notes:
 MLS sent only four teams to the Champions League in 2008–09 because the Canadian team, the Montreal Impact, played in the USL First Division at the time.

Performance by opposition in knockout series
The following table shows the performance of MLS teams in the knockout rounds for each home-and-away series for opponents from various leagues. During the first nine seasons of the Champions League, MLS teams did not play any foreign teams in knockout stage other than Mexico, Costa Rica, and Panama. With the change in tournament format in the 2018 season, specifically with the knockout rounds now including a round of 16, MLS teams play knockout matches against a greater variety of countries.

In the Champions League knockout rounds, MLS teams have played Mexican teams more than any other country, in some years facing multiple matchups. Seattle's 2013 quarter-final win over Mexico's UANL was the first time since the Champions League format began in 2008–09 that an MLS team eliminated a Mexican team in the knockout rounds. Montreal repeated the feat in 2015 when they beat Mexico's Pachuca in the quarter-finals. In 2018, Toronto FC and the New York Red Bulls both advanced to the semi-finals by beating Mexican teams, the first time that two MLS teams eliminated two Mexican teams in the same tournament. In 2020, Los Angeles FC became the first MLS team to eliminate three Mexican teams in the same tournament — beating Mexican opponents in the Round of 16, quarterfinals, and semifinals, before losing in the final to a Mexican team. MLS' improved performance against Mexican teams was attributed to MLS club academies focused on player development, and an increase in player salaries through the league's Targeted Allocation Money (TAM) program.

CONCACAF Club Index 

The CONCACAF Club Index was introduced in 2018 as a way of seeding the 16 teams in the knockout rounds. The index does not rank clubs but ranks member association qualification slots and is based on the past five prior years' results. Points are awarded as follows: 4 for participation, 3 for a win, 2 for Champions, 1 for draw, and 1 for stage advanced. 

The following table shows the index for the five Canadian and American teams. For context, the table also shows the index for the lowest-ranked Mexican slot and the highest-ranked Central American slot.

Performance by team

As of 2022, 21 MLS teams have appeared in the CONCACAF Champions League since the inaugural 2008–09 season.

Seattle Sounders FC became champions in 2022, ending Liga MX's winning streak in the competition. They were the fifth MLS club to make it to the final, following Real Salt Lake in 2011, Montreal Impact in 2015, Toronto FC in 2018 and Los Angeles FC in 2020.

Canadian teams in MLS – CF Montréal, Toronto FC and Vancouver Whitecaps FC – qualify to the Champions League via a separate competition, the Canadian Championship, and they represent the Canadian Soccer Association. The only times MLS standings were used for Canadian teams qualification were the 2014 season to determine the 2015–16 Champions League representative, as the Canadian Championship format was changed that season, and the 2020 season to determine the 2021 Champions League representative, as the 2020 Canadian Championship was postponed indefinitely due to the COVID-19 pandemic.

Starting in 2018, the group stage was removed, so MLS teams now start in the Round of 16 (first round).

ǂ – team represents Canada
* – team folded
Apps – CCL appearances
Pld – games played
W, D, L – wins, draws, losses

GF, GA, GD – goals for, goals against, goal difference

Records

Biggest win: 6 goal margin
Portland Timbers 6–0  Alpha United (2014–15 Group stage)

Biggest defeat: 5 goal margin
 Santos Laguna 6–1 Seattle Sounders FC (2011–12 Quarter-finals, first leg)

 Monterrey 5–0 Sporting Kansas City (2019 Semi-finals, first leg)

Other continental competitions
MLS teams have participated in other continental competitions.

Copa Sudamericana

 2005 — D.C. United played in the Round of 16, where they lost 3–4 in aggregate over two legs (1–1, 2–3) to Chile's Universidad Católica.
 2007 — D.C. United played in the Round of 16, where they lost 2–2 on aggregate on away goals (2–1, 0–1) to Mexico's Guadalajara.

See also 
 American soccer clubs in international competitions
 Canadian soccer clubs in international competitions

References

Major League Soccer records and statistics
American soccer clubs records and statistics
CONCACAF Champions League records and statistics